The Ipswich Town Player of the Year award is voted for annually by Ipswich Town's supporters in recognition of the best overall performance by an individual player throughout the football season. Towards the end of each season, fans are invited to cast their votes for this award either on-line or with one of the volunteers outside the stadium prior to a home game. The winner is the player who polls the most votes. The recipient is awarded a rosebowl trophy, presented at an awards ceremony immediately after one of the last home games of the season.

The inaugural award was made to Kevin Beattie in 1973 and he retained it the following season. Since then, four other players have won the award on more than one occasion: Terry Butcher and Matt Holland have received the honour twice, goalkeeper Bartosz Białkowski has won it three times, while John Wark has been presented with the award a record four times. Only one winner has gone on to manage the club full-time, George Burley, who won in 1977, although John Wark did act as joint caretaker-manager of the club with Paul Goddard for three matches in 1994.

Winners

Wins by playing position

Wins by nationality

See also
 :Category:Ipswich Town F.C. players
 Ipswich Town F.C.#Current squad

Footnotes

References

Players of the Year
Ipswich Town F.C. Players of the Year
Association football player non-biographical articles